Melaleuca concreta is a plant in the myrtle family Myrtaceae and is endemic to the south-west of Western Australia. The species name (concreta) refers to the way the fruits are tightly packed together.

Description
Their shape is linear or very narrow lance-shaped, with a pointed, although not prickly end and a prominent mid-vein.

The flowers are cream to white or yellow with petals that fall off as the flower opens or soon after. The stamens are arranged in five bundles around the flower, each bundle containing 3 to 9 stamens.

Taxonomy and naming
Melaleuca concreta was first formally described in 1862 by Ferdinand von Mueller in Fragmenta Phytographiae Australiae from a specimen found "in a rocky place near the Murchison River by Augustus Oldfield". The specific epithet (concreta) is from the Latin concretus, meaning "grown together" or "condensed", referring to the tightly packed fruit.

Distribution and habitat
This melaleuca occurs from the Murchison River district south to the Cataby and Regans Ford districts in the Avon Wheatbelt, Carnarvon , Geraldton Sandplains, Jarrah Forest, Murchison, Swan Coastal Plain and Yalgoo biogeographic regions. It grows in sandy soil or loam on sandstone outcrops, sandplains and limestone rises in a variety of vegetation associations.

Conservation status
Melaleuca concreta is listed as "not threatened" by the Government of Western Australia Department of Parks and Wildlife.

References

concreta
Myrtales of Australia
Plants described in 1862
Endemic flora of Western Australia
Taxa named by Ferdinand von Mueller